Pokrovsky Boulevard is a major boulevard in the central part of Moscow running from Clean Ponds to Vorontsovo Pole Street, including Yauzsky Boulevard.

With other boulevards like; Tverskoy Boulevard and Chistoprudny Boulevard, this is a part of the Boulevard Ring, running as a circle through the central Moscow.

Boulevards in Moscow
Cultural heritage monuments of regional significance in Moscow